Sir George Duff-Sutherland-Dunbar (29 May 1878 - 8 April 1962) was a British colonial officer and historian, notable for his 2-volume History of India, published in 1936. He also wrote adventure novels for children, one of which was serialised for the radio by the BBC in 1933. He was a member of the Dunbar of Hempriggs baronetage.

Dunbar was commissioned into the British army as a second lieutenant in the Cameron Highlanders on 3 August 1898, and was promoted to lieutenant on 1 April 1899. He served in the Indian Staff Corps from April 1899, and formally transferred to the Indian Army in June 1902.

Publications
Non-Fiction
Frontiers (London: Nicholson & Watson, 1932)
A History of India volume I & II (1936, reprinted 1995)
A History of India volume II (1936, reprinted 1943)
Other Men's Lives: A Study of Primitive Peoples (The Scientific Book Club, 1938)
India and the Passing of Empire (London, Nicholson & Watson 1951)

Fiction for Children
The Poisoned Arrow (pub date unknown but serialised on BBC Children's Hour in 1933)
Jungbir - Secret Agent (London: Burns Oates & Washbourne, 1934)

References

1878 births
1962 deaths
British colonial army officers
20th-century British historians
Historians of India
Place of birth missing
Place of death missing
Baronets in the Baronetage of Nova Scotia
British people in colonial India
Historians in British India